Lupinoblennius paivai, Paiva's blenny, is a species of combtooth blenny endemic to a small area Brazil from Bahia to Santa Catarina where its habitat is the tidal reaches of coastal streams and small rivers.  This species can grow to a length of  SL. The specific name honours the Brazilian oceanographer João de Paiva Carvalho (1903-1961) of the Instituto Oceanográfico da Universidade de São Paulo in recognition of his cooperation with Pinto.

References

paivai
Fish described in 1958